Nedunuri Krishnamurthy (10 October 1927 – 8 December 2014) was an Indian Carnatic vocalist. He was awarded the Madras Music Academy's Sangeetha Kalanidhi in 1991.

Early life
Krishnamurthy was born in 1927 at Kothapalli, Pithapuram Taluka, Godavari dt, Andhra Pradesh in what was then British India to Rama Murthy Panthulu and Vijayalakshmi.

His father held a minor job at the estate of the Raja of Pithapuram. He was under influence of his mother who sang Ashtapadis, Tarangas and the Adhyatma Ramayana kritis. She had a great influence on him while growing up.

Krishnamurthy joined the Maharaja's Music College at Vizianagaram in the year 1940 and received initial training in Violin and Vocal from the Dwaram Narasinga Rao Naidu. In 1949, he was influenced by carnatic vocalist, Sripada Pinakapani, and under his guidance developed his style of music.

Performing career
Krishnamurthy worked as Principal of S.V.College of Music and Dance, Tirupati; M.R.Government College of Music and Dance, Vizianagaram; Government College of Music and Dance, Secunderabad; and retired as  Principal of G.V.R Government College of Music and Dance, Vijayawada in 1985. Nedunuri's performances are characterised by adherence to tradition and his alapanas are renowned for capturing the essence of important Carnatic ragas.  He formed a popular partnership with the renowned violinist, Lalgudi Jayaraman, and the performances of the duo are much admired by listeners.

He was Dean of Faculty of the Fine Arts and Chairman of Board of Studies in Music of Sri Venkateswara University and Nagarjuna University. He contributed to Annamacharya Project of the TTD (Tirumala Tirupati Devasthanams) in tuning most of the "Annamacharya" kritis as we know them today.

Krishna Gana Sabha, Madras, conferred on "Nedunuri" the title Sangeetha Choodamani in 1976. The Music Academy, Madras conferred on him the most prestigious title of Sangeeta Kalanidhi in 1991.

He was named Asthana Vidwan of the Tirumala Tirupati Devasthanams and also of Sri Kanchi Kamakoti Peetham.

Prominent disciples
 Domada Chittabbayi
 Garimella Balakrishna Prasad
 Shobha Raju
 Saraswati Vidyardhi
 Malladi Brothers
 Sarada Subramanyam
 Seshulatha Viswanath
 T. Sreenidhi
 Padmavathi Thyagaraju
 Subba Narasiah Kramadathi
 Chaitanya Brothers (Varanasi Venkateswara Sharma & Bukkapatnam Krishnamacharyulu)

Death
Nedunuri Krishnamurthy died on 8 December 2014 at Visakhapatnam, aged 87, while undergoing treatment for lung cancer.

Albums & Songs

Discography
 Annamayya Antaranga Tharangam
 Annamayya Pada Kadambam
 Annamayya Pada Kamalam
 Annamayya Pada Neerajanam
 Annamayya Pada Ravali
 Annamayya Pada Sammohanam
 Annamayya Pada Vasantham
 Pahi Nareyana by PM Audios & Entertainments
 Guru Upadesham by PM Audios & Entertainments
 Srihari Rasakrithi (TTD Release)
 Bhadrachala Ramadasu Keerthanalu (with Dasarathi Sataka Poems) (Alivelumanga Sarvayya Charitable Trust)
 Raga Sudha Rasam
 Rare Krithi’s of Tyagaraja
 Classical Treat by Nedunuri Krishnamurthy 
 Raga Madhur (Audio) by Swathi Soft Solutions Company release
 Raga Ranjani (DVD) by Swathi Soft Solutions Company release

Awards and honours

References

External links

Website about Nedunuri

1927 births
2014 deaths
Male Carnatic singers
Carnatic singers
20th-century Indian male classical singers
Singers from Andhra Pradesh
Deaths from lung cancer in India
Telugu people
People from East Godavari district
Recipients of the Sangeet Natak Akademi Award